Verona is a census-designated place in the town of Verona in Oneida County, New York, United States.

Verona is part of the Utica–Rome Metropolitan Statistical Area.

Geography

Demographics

References

Census-designated places in Oneida County, New York
Census-designated places in New York (state)
Utica–Rome metropolitan area